London Warsaw New York is the second solo studio album by Polish-born singer–songwriter Basia, released in February 1990 by Epic Records. It spawned one of Basia's biggest hits, "Cruising for Bruising".

Overview
The album's title was inspired by the tag "London Paris New York" often seen on perfume packaging. Basia decided to replace Paris with Warsaw to emphasize the fact that she is Polish, and that the album was written between the three countries represented by those cities. All three cities are name-checked in the song "Copernicus": "Our love will take this globe by storm/If it's London, Warsaw, or New York". The line is also sung in Polish later in the track: "Naszą miłością podbijemy glob/Londyn, Warszawę albo Nowy Jork". The other song incorporating Basia's native language is "Reward", in which she sings: "Jesteś moją nagrodą" (English: "You are my reward").

"Baby You're Mine" was released as the lead single in early 1990 and was met with moderate success. "Cruising for Bruising" followed as the second single and became Basia's biggest hit yet. In North America, it served as the first single, followed by "Baby You're Mine". "Copernicus" was a Japan-only single, and although never commercially released elsewhere, the track was performed on Late Night with David Letterman on Thanksgiving night on November 22, 1990. The final single was the cover of "Until You Come Back to Me (That's What I'm Gonna Do)" which charted on Billboards Adult Contemporary list.

London Warsaw New York is often regarded as Basia's best album. It also remains her most successful release commercially, having sold in over 2 million copies worldwide, with half of the total shifted in the USA alone, where the record was certified platinum in August 1992. It became Billboards Contemporary Jazz Album of 1990. In 2015, the album was re-released by independent UK label Cherry Red Records as 2 CD deluxe edition featuring instrumentals, remixes and demo versions.

Track listing
All songs written by Basia Trzetrzelewska and Danny White, except where noted.

"Cruising for Bruising" – 4:08
"Best Friends" – 4:01
"Brave New Hope" – 4:06
"Baby You're Mine" – 3:34
"Ordinary People" – 4:58
"Reward" – 5:08
"Until You Come Back to Me" (Stevie Wonder, Clarence Paul, Morris Broadnax) – 3:51
"Copernicus" – 3:51
"Not an Angel" – 4:23
"Take Him Back Rachel" – 4:18

Personnel 
 Basia Trzetrzelewska – vocals
 Danny White – keyboards, programming
 Andy Ross – guitars (1, 4)
 Marc Antoine – wah wah guitar (2)
 Peter White – guitars (2, 4–10), accordion (5)
 Julian Crampton – bass (2, 9)
 Andres Lafone – bass (4, 8, 10)
 Andy Gangadeen – additional drums (1, 2, 4, 8), drums (3)
 Snowboy – percussion (1, 3, 10), congas (2), berimbau (4), shaker (4)
 Robin Jones – percussion (5, 8)
 Steve Gregory – saxophone (5)
 Ronnie Ross – baritone saxophone (8), bass saxophone (9)
 Bud Beadle – saxophone (10)
 Kevin Robinson – trumpet (2, 5, 7, 9, 10)
 Fiachra Trench – string arrangements (3)
 Gavyn Wright – strings leader (3), strings (4)

Production 
 Arranged and produced by Basia Trzetrzelewska and Danny White.
 Recorded by Mike Dignam at Eden Studios (London, England).
 Assistant engineers – Richard Barraclough, Derek Fisher and Donal Hodgson.
 Mixed by Phil Harding at PWL Studios (London, England).
 Mix assistants – Tony King and Les Sharma
 Mastered by Tim Young at The Hit Factory (London, England).
 Design – The Leisure Process
 Photography – Paul Cox and Mark Borthwick
 Management – Alan Seifert

Charts

Weekly charts

Year-end charts

Certifications

References

External links
 The official Basia website
 London Warsaw New York on Discogs

1990 albums
Basia albums
Epic Records albums